Jesús Agramonte Terry (born 26 April 1959) is a Cuban handball player. He competed in the 1980 Summer Olympics.

References

1959 births
Living people
Handball players at the 1980 Summer Olympics
Cuban male handball players
Olympic handball players of Cuba
Pan American Games medalists in handball
Pan American Games silver medalists for Cuba
Medalists at the 1987 Pan American Games